The Ada News is a daily newspaper published five days a week in Ada, Oklahoma. The publication's coverage area includes Pontotoc County and portions of Coal County, Garvin County, Hughes County, Johnston County, Murray County and Seminole County. The newspaper is published Tuesday through Friday and Saturday.

The Thomson Corporation sold The Ada News, along with 11 other papers, to the American Publishing Company (later Hollinger International) in 1995. Hollinger sold off most of its small papers in 1999, and The Ada News went to Community Newspaper Holdings.

The publication is owned by Community Newspaper Holdings Inc., a company founded in 1997 by Ralph Martin. CNHI newspapers are clustered in groups that cross-sell packages to advertisers and occasionally feature editorial content written by a regional reporter working directly for CNHI.

History
The newspaper began publication on March 14, 1904. Beginning May 26, 1968, a Sunday edition was added. The newspaper was published by Carlton Weaver & Company at one time. The name of the paper was changed to The Ada News in summer 2012.

Maurisa Nelson was appointed General Manager of The Ada News on Oct. 21, 2019.

References

External links
 The Ada News Website
 CNHI Website

Newspapers published in Oklahoma
Ada, Oklahoma
1904 establishments in Oklahoma Territory